Bengtesgård meadow is a nature reserve in Falkenberg Municipality, Sweden. Hawfinches nest in the area and another red-listed species, Grifola frondosa, can be found on the ground.

References

Nature reserves in Halland County
Falkenberg Municipality
Protected areas established in 1972
Meadows